Luka Bobičanec (born 23 May 1993) is a Croatian football midfielder who plays for Slovenian PrvaLiga side Celje.

Club career
Bobičanec spent a few seasons in the Austrian lower leagues, with SV Stegersbach and SV Heiligenbrunn.

Honours
Nafta 1903
MNZ Lendava Cup: 2015–16

Polet Sveti Martin na Muri
Međužupanijska nogometna liga Čakovec-Varaždin: 2016–17

Mura
Slovenian First League: 2020–21
Slovenian Second League: 2017–18
Slovenian Cup: 2019–20

Individual
 Slovenian Second League Player of the Year: 2017–18
 Slovenian Second League Team of the Year: 2017–18

References

External links
  
 Luka Bobičanec at NZS 
 Luka Bobicanec at OFB 

1993 births
Living people
Sportspeople from Čakovec
Association football midfielders
Croatian footballers
NK Međimurje players
NK Čakovec players
SV Stegersbach players
NK Nafta Lendava players
NŠ Mura players
NK Celje players
Second Football League (Croatia) players
Austrian Regionalliga players
Slovenian Second League players
Slovenian PrvaLiga players
Croatian expatriate footballers
Expatriate footballers in Austria
Croatian expatriate sportspeople in Austria
Expatriate footballers in Slovenia
Croatian expatriate sportspeople in Slovenia